Robert Harris (born September 26, 1963 in Halifax, Nova Scotia) is a Canadian curler.

Harris played second for Mark Dacey's men's team from 2002 to 2007 and from 1998 to 1999. Harris also played Mixed with Dacey around this time. Harris, Dacey, third Heather Smith-Dacey and lead Laine Peters won the Canadian Mixed Curling Championships in 2002 after having gone to the tournament the two previous years. Playing for Dacey's men's team which included Bruce Lohnes at third and Andrew Gibson at lead, Harris won three provincial championships (2003, 2004, 2006), a Brier in 2004 and a bronze medal at the World Curling Championships the same year.

Harris along with Dacey, Lohnes and Gibson also participated in two Continental Cups, in 2004 and 2005. They were on the losing side in 2004, but won the event as part of team North America in 2005.

Prior to playing for Dacey, Harris skipped his own rink, except for one season which he played third for Shawn Adams.

Harris is also a NCCP Level II Coach and has represented the Province of Nova Scotia, coaching Junior Men's Teams in 1990, 1991 and 2010.

Harris is a Project Manager at the I.T. consulting firm Keane Canada. Harris retired from competitive men's curling in 2007, but is active in senior's play.

Grand Slam Record

References

External links
 
 CCA Stats Archive
 
 

Curlers from Nova Scotia
1963 births
Living people
Brier champions
Canadian mixed curling champions
Sportspeople from Halifax, Nova Scotia
Canadian male curlers
Continental Cup of Curling participants
Canada Cup (curling) participants